Ukrainian territorial defence may refer to:

 Territorial defence battalions (Ukraine), military units mobilized in March 2014 and integrated into Ukrainian Land Forces in November
 Territorial Defense Forces (Ukraine), a military reserve component of the Ukrainian Armed Forces formed in January 2015

See also 
 Ukrainian volunteer battalions
 Special Tasks Patrol Police